Jessica Tan Wei Han (born 16 July 1993) is a Singaporean badminton player. Together with Terry Hee, they won their first BWF World Tour title as a duo at the 2022 India Open. Tan along with Hee also won the gold medal in the mixed doubles event at the 2022 Commonwealth Games, a first for Singapore in that discipline at the Games.

Early life
Tan was born on 16 July 1993 in Singapore, to parents Richard and Joyce. She has two elder sisters who were former national team players. Growing up in a badminton-crazy family, Tan picked up the sport at the tender age of seven after watching her sisters play. With the intention to compete full time, she withdrew from her placing at Nanyang Technological University (NTU) and joined the national team at the age of 18 to pursue her badminton dream.

Career

2014–2021: Southeast Asian bronzes, national title 
Tan won her first senior title at the 2014 Singapore International tournament in the mixed doubles event partnered with Terry Hee. Tan was part of the national team that won the women's team bronze medals at the 2015, 2017 and 2019 Southeast Asian Games. In April of 2017, Tan reached a career-high ranking of 15 with Hee. She competed at the 2018 Commonwealth Games in Gold Coast, Australia. Tan then split up with Hee, as he had to undergo his mandatory 2-year national service in 2019. Tan then won the mixed doubles national championships with her partner, Danny Bawa Chrisnanta.

2022: First World Tour Super 500 title, Commonwealth Games success
In January, Tan won her first Super 500 title with Hee, at the India Open, defeating the Malaysian paring of Chen Tang Jie and Peck Yen Wei in the final, 21–15, 21–18 in straight games. In March, Tan won her second BWF World Tour title with Hee, the Orléans Masters, defeating Rehan Naufal Kusharjanto and Lisa Ayu Kusumawati in the final, 21–12, 16–21, 21–13 in rubber games, winning their third title as a married couple.

At the 2022 Commonwealth Games in August, Tan was part of the Singaporean team who won the bronze medal in the mixed team events as the Singaporean team defeated England 3–0 at the bronze medal playoff. Tan had also competed at the individual mixed doubles event with her husband Hee. Their opponents in the final were England's Marcus Ellis and Lauren Smith, who were playing on home soil and were ranked higher than them. Tan and Hee defeated them in two straight sets, 21–16, 21–15, winning a historic gold medal and Singapore's first Commonwealth Games badminton mixed doubles gold.

Personal life 
Tan has been married to fellow Singaporean shuttler Terry Hee since 2021, who she had often partnered with at mixed doubles tournaments since the start of her professional career. Their victory at the 2021 Czech Open, defeating Russians Lev Barinov and Anastasiia Boiarun, was their first tournament as a married duo.

Achievements

Commonwealth Games
Mixed doubles

BWF World Tour (2 titles)
The BWF World Tour, which was announced on 19 March 2017 and implemented in 2018, is a series of elite badminton tournaments sanctioned by the Badminton World Federation (BWF). The BWF World Tours are divided into levels of World Tour Finals, Super 1000, Super 750, Super 500, Super 300 (part of the HSBC World Tour), and the BWF Tour Super 100.

Mixed doubles

BWF International Challenge/Series (8 titles, 2 runners-up) 
Mixed doubles

  BWF International Challenge tournament
  BWF International Series tournament

References

External links 
 
 Tan Wei Han at Singapore Badminton Association
 

Living people
1993 births
Singaporean female badminton players
Singaporean people of Chinese descent
Badminton players at the 2018 Commonwealth Games
Badminton players at the 2022 Commonwealth Games
Commonwealth Games gold medallists for Singapore
Commonwealth Games bronze medallists for Singapore
Commonwealth Games medallists in badminton
Competitors at the 2015 Southeast Asian Games
Competitors at the 2017 Southeast Asian Games
Competitors at the 2019 Southeast Asian Games
Competitors at the 2021 Southeast Asian Games
Southeast Asian Games bronze medalists for Singapore
Southeast Asian Games medalists in badminton
Medallists at the 2022 Commonwealth Games